John Desmond Singleton  (born 9 November 1941) is an Australian entrepreneur. He built his success and wealth in the advertising business in Australia in the 1970s and 1980s. He now has diverse investment interests in radio broadcasting, publishing and thoroughbred breeding and racing.
In 2019, Singleton sold his 32.2% stake in Macquarie Media for A$80 million, to Nine Entertainment.

Early life
Singleton was born in the Sydney suburb of Enfield and educated at Fort Street High School.

Advertising career
He commenced a career in advertising in 1958 as a mail boy in the Sydney office of J. Walter Thompson and after five years took a creative role at Berry Currie Advertising. Five years hence he was the Creative Director at that agency. In 1968 together with his Art Director partner Dunc McAllan, he started his own agency in Sydney and the pair soon teamed-up with Rob Palmer and Mike Strauss who had an existing small Melbourne shop with media buying accreditation to start Singleton, Palmer and Strauss, McAllan. SPASM opened with offices in Sydney and Melbourne.

SPASM (and Singleton in particular) are notable in the history of Australian advertising for embracing an ocker voice in their communications at a time when multi-national agency groups were making their presence felt with the advent of strategic planning and British or American-imitating tones of voice. SPASM's clients were largely local Sydney retailers and rather than using polished voices, Singleton's ads embraced the tone of working-class man. A successful campaign was created for the wholesalers David Holdings. The voice-over screamed the retailer's prices before the irritating catchphrase "Where do you get it?". Similar "low-brow" approaches were taken for Jax Tyres "Jax the ripper Tyremen with the deals" and for Hudsons Timber and Hardware using a toothless old handyman spruiking "'udsons with a haitch". Critics derided this style as ocker advertising but it would pave the way for the later success of the laconic and self-deprecating style of local Australian advertising such as that created by the Mojo agency in the 1980s.

In 1973 Singleton and his partners sold SPASM to the US Doyle Dane Bernbach and Singleton for a time was managing director of DDB's Australian operations. Working for a large multi-national with overseas owners was a challenge for Singleton and he left the business in 1977 triggering a long non-compete provision in his contract. In 1985 Singleton started up again on his own with "John Singleton Advertising". Sydney stockbroker Rene Rivkin bought a silent-holding in the agency during its development in the 1980s. Singleton developed close ties with the Australian Labor Party and created the advertising for Bob Hawke's successful 1983 election campaign. John Singleton Advertising listed publicly, became the Singleton Group Ltd in 1994, then grew to become the STW Communications Group Ltd in 2002 which now owns over fifty Australian marketing and advertising businesses including the Singleton Ogilvy & Mather ad agency and holds an interest in J. Walter Thompson's Australian operations. Along the way Singleton acquired personal stakes in ventures including the 1990 buy-out of the Ten Group TV network from receivership and an acquisition in 2000 of Indonesia's No 3 network SCTV. These personal holdings in addition to the success and growth STW Group interests enabled Singleton to amass a massive personal fortune.

In 2019, Singleton sold his 32.2% stake in Macquarie Media for A$80 million, which Nine Entertainment purchased for $1.46 per share.

Honours and awards

In 1994 Singleton was appointed as a Member of the Order of Australia for service to the community through his own personal support and fundraising activities more broadly. In 2000 Singleton was awarded the Australian Sports Medal. In 2009 Singleton was included in the inaugural twelve inductees to Ad News magazine's, Australian Advertising Hall of Fame.

Personal life
He has eight children from six marriages. He has been married to Margaret Wall (Jack born 1971), Maggie Eckardt, Belinda Green (Jessie born 1982, Sally born 1984), Liz Hayes, Jennifer Murrant - de facto (Joe born 1993, Hannah born 1995) and Julie Martin (Dawnie born 1998, Summer born 2000, Daisy born 2006).

Wealth rankings

References

Further reading

External links
Original Singo 27 July 2002
History of Sydney Advertising
Blackman "Post War Advertising in Australia" 1997
Singleton's Advertising Age profile 2002

1941 births
Living people
Australian advertising executives
Australian copywriters
Members of the Order of Australia
Recipients of the Australian Sports Medal
Businesspeople from Sydney
People educated at Fort Street High School